William Churchill (August 27, 1885 – October 15, 1941) was an American long-distance runner. He competed in the marathon at the 1924 Summer Olympics.

References

External links
 

1885 births
1941 deaths
Athletes (track and field) at the 1924 Summer Olympics
American male long-distance runners
American male marathon runners
Olympic track and field athletes of the United States
Sportspeople from Dorset
20th-century American people
English emigrants to the United States